Terry Horne (2 October 1953 – 7 September 2019) was a New Zealand cricketer. He played in twelve first-class matches for Central Districts from 1977 and 1980.

See also
 List of Central Districts representative cricketers

References

External links
 

1953 births
2019 deaths
New Zealand cricketers
Central Districts cricketers
Cricketers from Nelson, New Zealand